The Swedish Union of Civil Servants (Statstjänstemannaförbundet, ST) is a trade union in Sweden. With a membership of 97,000 it is the largest union of civil servants in the country.

ST is affiliated with the Swedish Confederation of Professional Employees (TCO).

Swedish Confederation of Professional Employees
Civil service trade unions
Trade unions in Sweden
Public Services International